Jan Wojtas (born 26 November 1966) is a Polish biathlete. He competed at the 1992 Winter Olympics and the 1994 Winter Olympics.

References

1966 births
Living people
Polish male biathletes
Olympic biathletes of Poland
Biathletes at the 1992 Winter Olympics
Biathletes at the 1994 Winter Olympics
People from Kamienna Góra